Dalton Trumbo's Reluctant Cabaret are a musical comedy double act. 

They are now known by the name Reluctant Cabaret.

Reluctant Cabaret are made up of and Lady Hugo with special guest appearances from the Reverend Po Chi. Trumbo used to have a dutiful man servant, Jenifer but he was sacked for stealing the naughty juice.

Their brand of comedy is absurd, silly and musical.
 In 2002 they won the Krater New Act of the Year Competition at the Komedia Brighton and were voted Laughing Horse audience favorite act
 In 2003 they won a BBC New Comedy Award
 In 2004 they produced a CD of their songs called 'Conception'
 In 2005 they took their show to the Edinburgh Fringe and received four star reviews from The Scotsman and The List
 In 2007 they briefly retired from comedy to concentrate
 In 2011 they return

External links
 Official Facebook Page
 Reluctant Cabaret blog
 Fan review of a Reluctant Cabaret show

British comedy troupes